KMOD may refer to:

 KMOD-FM, a radio station (97.5 FM) licensed to Tulsa, Oklahoma, US
 Modesto City–County Airport (ICAO code), in Modesto, California, US
 Kernel module, in computing